Memorain is a speed/groove/thrash metal band from Greece, formed by guitarist/vocalist Ilias Papadakis in 1999.

History 
After a few lineup changes in 2001, the band recorded their first demo CD titled "Until You Die". Drawing influence mainly from the American Heavy/Thrash scene, the band contributed a song for the "Voices Of Death Part 5" compilation album and a few months later they paid tribute to one of their favorite bands, Megadeth, recording a cover version of the song "Disconnect" for the album Droogie – A Megadeth Tribute.

In August 2002, the band signed a two-record deal with local label NMC Music, and their first album "Digital Crimes" was released a couple of months later. In 2003, Memorain released their second album White Line, featuring guitarist James Murphy (Testament, Obituary, Death, etc.). The band also contributed songs to numerous compilation albums. In September 2003, the band composed the music theme for Greece's premier metal TV show, TV War – a TV show supported by the Greek Metal Hammer magazine. In September 2005, Memorain signed an exclusive contract with EMI Greece and two months later the band started recording their new album "Reduced To Ashes" with Nick Menza (ex-Megadeth) on drums and Jeff Waters (Annihilator), as a special guest. Recorded partially in Los Angeles-California "Reduced To Ashes" was released by EMI Music Greece on 17 April 2006. After a 5-year gap, the band re-entered the studio in 2011 with a new line-up featuring Ralph Santolla, Chris Valagao, Steve DiGiorgio and Gene Hoglan to record its fourth full-length album called "Evolution", which was released in 2012. In the following year, Memorain with a new lineup, released an 8-track album that included re-recordings of songs from their first two official albums called "Digital line" and their sevenths studio release called "Seven Sacrifices". In September 2014 the band announced that they had compiled their eight studio album entitled "Zero Hour".

Members

Current members 
 Ilias Papadakis – Guitar
 Nikolas Perlepe – Guitar
 Vagelis Kolios – Vocals
 Babis Kapageridis – Bass
 Sevan Barsam – Drums

Former members 
 Jason Mercury – Guitars
 Andreas Boutos – Vocals
 Dimitris Anestis – Bass
 Tolis Mistiloglou – Drums
 John Karathanasis – Bass
 Panos Andricopoulos – Drums
 Alex Doutsis – Guitars
 Kostas Bagiatis – Bass
 Marc Reign – Drums
 Nick Menza – Drums
 Ralph Santolla – Guitars
 Chris Valagao – Vocals
 Steve DiGiorgio – Bass
 Gene Hoglan – Drums
 Nick Yngve – Drums

Timeline

Discography

Studio albums 
Digital Crimes (2002)
White Line (2003)
Reduced To Ashes (2006)
Evolution (2012)
Digital Line (2013)
Seven Sacrifices (2013)
Zero Hour (2014)
Duality of Man (2016)

Videos 
"TV War" (2007)
"False Positive" (2014)
"Divided" (2015)
"Guardian Knight" (2016)

References

External links 
Memorain.com

Thrash metal musical groups
Greek heavy metal musical groups
Musical groups from Athens
Musical groups established in 1999
Musical quintets
1999 establishments in Greece